Jazz at the Pawnshop is a multi-session recording made by Gert Palmcrantz on December 6–7, 1976, at Jazzpuben Stampen (Pawnshop) in Stockholm, Sweden. A pawnshop had operated on the site prior to the jazz club. Proprius Records founder Jacob Boethius produced the album, and it has been issued at least five times under multiple labels and formats. The album is regarded by many audiophiles as one of the best sounding jazz recordings of the 20th Century.

Artists
The recording features Arne Domnérus, alto sax, clarinet; Bengt Hallberg, piano; Lars Erstrand, vibes; Georg Riedel, bass; and Egil Johansen, drums.

Original release
Proprius Records originally released a 180-gram, 2-LP vinyl recording (Prop 7778-79) in 1977. This version of the album featured the following tracks:

Disc 1

Disc 2

References

1977 albums
Jazz albums by Swedish artists